Ignacio de Leon (born 12 February 1991, Montevideo, Uruguay) is an Uruguayan futsal player who currently plays for Tranmere Rovers. He formerly played for the English club Middlesbrough Futsal Club and has 7 caps for the Uruguay national futsal team.

References

1983 births
Living people
Uruguayan men's futsal players
Sportspeople from Montevideo